Luis Ismael Vázquez (born 24  April 2001) is an Argentine footballer playing as a striker for Boca Juniors.

Career statistics

Notes

Honours
Boca Juniors
Primera División: 2022
Copa Argentina: 2019–20
Copa de la Liga Profesional: 2020, 2022
Supercopa Argentina: 2022

References

2001 births
Living people
Argentine footballers
Association football forwards
Club Atlético Patronato footballers
Boca Juniors footballers
Argentine Primera División players
People from Catamarca Province